Kai Warner was the stage name of Werner Last (27 October 1926 – 9 July 1982), a German bandleader and musician, and the brother  of James Last and Robert Last.

Biography

Born in Bremen, Warner took piano lessons from Ernst Weelen and received theory instruction from the Max Reger and Engelbert Humperdinck student Richard Bulling.

After the war, Werner Last appeared as a trombonist along with his brothers Hans (bassist, later known as James Last) and Robert Last (drummer) in Bremen music halls and in the American clubs in the vicinity of Bremerhaven.  At this point, he was discovered by the composer and manager Friedrich Meyer and hired for the newly formed dance orchestra of Radio Bremen. The Last brothers became well known as members of the Last-Becker Ensemble. Warner Last found his first success as an arranger. After the disbandment of the Bremen dance orchestra in 1948, he played for a time in a 12-man band, then went to seek his fortune in the USA. Before this, he married the 18-year-old Hjördis Harlow, an American of Norwegian descent. From this marriage came two sons, Steven and Warner.

In the USA, Warner had to make his living as a casual labourer for several months before he was admitted into the New York musician's union. As a trombonist, he belonged to several renowned big bands. As well, he studied music theory at New York University with Schillinger professor Rudolf Schramm.

In 1958, Warner Last returned to Germany and arranged numerous film scores. In 1966 he signed a contract as a producer with Polydor; he discovered and produced Renate Kern. As Kai Warner, he started his own orchestra, which included many musicians who played with James Last (such as his brother Robert Last, who had already played drums on the earliest James Last sessions). In 1975, Kai Warner switched from Polydor to Philips.

Besides his LPs like Pops For Minis, Happy Together, Goldtimer 1 and 2, his name is forever linked with the Go-In series, which continued later on Philips under the name Go-In Party.

Other albums: So In Love, Love Songs, Romantic Songs, Wer recht in Freuden tanzen will, Warner Plays Wagner, Golden Violins, Volkslieder Festival, On The Road To Philadelphia, Swingin' Johann, Salsoul Explosion, A Glass Of Champagne, Dance To The Beatles, Zum Tanz Marsch Marsch, Polka wie noch nie, Oriental Nights, It's Country Time, and naturally the Christmas album Christmas Party.

He also made several recordings with his Kai Warner Singers, a mixed choir made up of six women and six men often accompanied only by a rhythm section, like Ray Conniff used to do it in his 70s albums.

He died in Hamburg aged 55.

External links
Website http://www.grandorchestras.com/kaiwarner/index.html

1926 births
1982 deaths
Musicians from Bremen
Easy listening musicians
Light music composers
20th-century composers
20th-century German musicians
20th-century German male musicians
Last-Becker Ensemble members